The Courtship of Eddie's Father is an American sitcom based on the 1963 film of the same name, which was based on a novel by Mark Toby (edited by Dorothy Wilson).

The series is about a widower, Tom Corbett (played by Bill Bixby), who is a magazine publisher, and his young son, Eddie (played by Brandon Cruz). Eddie believes his father should marry, and manipulates situations surrounding the women his father is interested in. (Eddie's matchmaking efforts were the theme of the film, but gradually became less central to the storylines in the series.)

The series debuted on September 17, 1969, and was last broadcast on March 1, 1972.

Bixby received an Emmy nomination for the show.

Plot

The show centered on Tom Corbett (Bill Bixby), a handsome, thirty-something magazine publisher and widower from Los Angeles.  Following the death of his wife Helen, Tom is left to raise his mischievous, freckle-faced son, six-year-old Eddie (Brandon Cruz). Eddie wants a new mother, so to that end, he cleverly manipulates his father's relationships with women, sometimes even trying to set his father up to fall for women Eddie knows and likes first.

The father-son duo's domestic arrangements are managed, with great discretion, by their Japanese housekeeper, Mrs. Livingston (Miyoshi Umeki). Her sage advice adds to the comedic mix in situations where she looks after Eddie, and sometimes helps him further his schemes to marry off his father and find a new mother. Mrs. Livingston addresses her employer, Tom, as "Mr. Eddie's Father." Characters from Tom Corbett's office included Tina Rickles (Kristina Holland) as his secretary and Norman Tinker (James Komack) as the magazine's photographer and token radical. Norman served as Eddie's honorary uncle.

Cast

Main cast
Bill Bixby and Brandon Cruz are the only two actors to appear in every episode of the series.
 Bill Bixby as Tom Corbett – A widower and a magazine editor
 Brandon Cruz as Eddie Corbett – Tom's son
 Miyoshi Umeki as Mrs. Livingston – Tom's and Eddie's housekeeper
 Kristina Holland as Tina Rickles – Tom's secretary
 James Komack as Norman Tinker – Tom's partner at a magazine company

Guest cast
During its three-season run, many familiar or up-and-coming actors who guest-starred on the show went on to become successful stars, including: Jodie Foster, Sally Struthers, Bruce Kirby, Pat Harrington Jr., Diana Muldaur, Willie Aames, Warren Berlinger, Suzanne Pleshette, Yvonne Craig, Cicely Tyson, Richard X. Slattery, Tippi Hedren, Trisha Noble, John Fiedler, Alan Oppenheimer, Lou Jacobi, Will Geer, Bill Dana, Jerry Stiller, Anne Meara, Ronny Graham, Lori Saunders, Ann Prentiss, Ron Ely, Carol Lawrence, and George Takei. Future Happy Days stars Pat Morita and Erin Moran also made guest appearances. Established stars also made cameo appearances, such as Eve McVeagh as a grumpy neighbor named Lorraine Karn, Sammy Davis Jr. as an insurance man, and Bixby's then-wife Brenda Benet as Tom's girlfriend.

Production

Crew
Comedy producer James Komack served as both the creator and the executive producer of the show. In 1970, Bill Bixby made his debut as a director, going on to direct eight episodes of the show.

Theme song
The television show's theme song, "Best Friend", was written and performed by Harry Nilsson; it was an adaptation of his song "Girlfriend" with new lyrics written for the show. The theme was played over opening credits showing Bixby and Cruz in various happy moments.

An edited version of Nilsson's "Best Friend" was used as the theme song for the 2006 MTV series Rob & Big.

Cancellation
The show was cancelled in 1972, when Bixby had a falling out with James Komack over the show's direction. Many of the later episodes focused on Norman, Tom, and Eddie rather than on the relationship between Tom and Eddie. Years after the show was cancelled, it became quietly popular as reruns in syndication.

Home media
Warner Bros. has released all three seasons of  The Courtship of Eddie's Father on DVD in Region 1 via their Warner Archive Collection. These are Manufacture-on-Demand (MOD) releases, available via WBShop.com and Amazon.

Failed spin-offs
There have been three attempts at re-making the show, none of which resulted in a new series.

As early as 1999, Entertainment Weekly reported plans for Nicolas Cage to star in and produce a feature film remake of the series. In a 2011 interview, Brandon Cruz believed Cage was likely no longer interested in the project because Cage's son Weston, who would have played Eddie, had grown too old for the part.

In 2003, filming began on a new television pilot which starred Ken Marino and Josh Hutcherson, but it was not picked up by a network. The child star of the previous series, Brandon Cruz, played a supporting role.

In 2014, Willie Garson was developing a version in which he would star as Norman Tinker. Garson was going to write and produce alongside feature filmmakers Mark Levin, Jennifer Flackett and Conan O'Brien.The series never eventuated.

References

External links

 
  The Courtship of Eddie's Father theme song, by Harry Nilsson

1969 American television series debuts
1972 American television series endings
1960s American sitcoms
1970s American sitcoms
American Broadcasting Company original programming
Live action television shows based on films
Television series about widowhood
Television series based on adaptations
Television series by MGM Television
Television shows set in Los Angeles